Michaels Stores, Inc., more commonly known as Michaels, is a privately held chain of American and Canadian arts and crafts stores. It is one of North America's largest providers of arts, crafts, framing, floral and wall décor, and merchandise for makers and do-it-yourself home decorators. The company is part of The Michaels Companies, founded in 2014 and headquartered in Irving, Texas.

In addition to Michaels stores, The Michaels Companies operates Aaron Brothers Custom Framing store-within-a-store, and Artistree, a manufacturer of custom and specialty framing merchandise. The company also develops over a dozen private brands sold in Michaels stores, including Recollections, Studio Décor, Bead Landing, Creatology and Ashland. 

As of January 2021, there were 1,252 Michaels stores in 49 out of 50 states in the U.S., and Canada, with approximately $5.362 billion in sales for fiscal 2020.

History

Early history
The company was founded in 1973 by Michael J. Dupey in Dallas, Texas.

In 1973, Dallas businessman Michael J. Dupey founded Michaels in Dallas, Texas, when he converted a money-losing Ben Franklin five and dime store into an arts and crafts store.

In 1982, Dallas businessman Sam Wyly bought a controlling interest in the company, which by then had 11 outlets with annual revenues around $10 million. After the sale, Dupey founded MJ Designs, which was later bought out by The Michaels Companies.
 

In 1984, the company was first publicly traded (on NASDAQ) under parent entity The Michaels Companies, which operated 16 stores. Over the next decade, the company bought craft and hobby stores in local and regional markets.

Growth
In 1994, Michaels Stores expanded acquired craft stores in the Pacific Northwest, including Treasure House Crafts, Oregon Craft & Floral Supply, and H&H Craft & Floral. In the Midwest and Northeast, it bought Leewards Creative Crafts, a 101-unit store chain.

In 1995, Michaels Stores acquired Aaron Brothers Holdings, Inc., a specialty framing and art supply store.

By 1996, Michaels' sales reached $1.24 billion with 450 stores.

In 2006, two private equity groups, Bain Capital and the Blackstone Group, purchased Michaels Stores for $6 billion, taking it private.

In May 2007, Martha Stewart and Michaels launched "Martha Stewart Crafts," an online resource for home "do-it-yourselfers" with how-to instructions, projects, and crafting products.

In the fall of 2008, Michaels Stores opened its 1,000th store.

In 2010, Michaels began a partnership with Chef Duff to feature the Duff Goldman Collection in its stores. The line includes baking products including fondant, sprinkle sets, color spray, cake tattoos and color paste.

In February 2011, Michaels and Aaron Brothers stores suffered a data compromise that affected their debit card terminals in 20 states. The company alerted customers who made PIN-based purchases between February 8 and May 6, 2011, that their data may have been exposed. A class action lawsuit was filed against Michaels in the County Court of Passaic, New Jersey over the incident.

Reorganization
In March 2012, Reuters reported that JPMorgan Chase and Goldman Sachs were "the leads on what could be one of the year's largest IPOs in the retail sector", with one source saying the IPO would be registered in April. Reuters further reported that Michaels posted earnings before interest, income taxes, depreciation and amortization of $661 million in 2011 and had total debt of $3.5 billion as of January 28, 2012. The filing, for a $500 million common stock issue, came on March 30. The ticker would be MIK on the NYSE. A report on the filing put the company's debt at $3.8 billion and said 2011 revenue was $4.2 billion and net income was $176M. In July, the IPO was "put on hold indefinitely" after CEO John Menzer suffered a stroke. In Menzer's absence, Lew Klessel, Bain managing director, and Charles Sonsteby, Michaels' chief administrative officer and chief financial officer, served in a temporary Office of CEO.

In February 2013, Chuck Rubin was appointed CEO. Rubin was president and CEO of personal-care specialty retailer Ulta Beauty at the time of his appointment and had previously been with Office Depot and Accenture. The Michaels Office of CEO was discontinued when Rubin assumed his position later in February and Sonsteby continued as CAO/CFO.

In June 2014, Michaels became a public company under newly formed parent The Michaels Companies.

In 2020, Ashley Buchanan, formerly of Walmart, became the new CEO of Michaels. Later that year, Michaels introduced a new store concept at two locations in Texas, which features a new open layout built around "inspiration hubs", new "maker space" areas for instruction, and self-service pickup lockers for online orders. The company stated that aspects of this concept would be introduced at new and renovated locations in the future (such as its location in Regina, Saskatchewan, which in 2023 became the first Canadian location to adopt the format after having been closed following a fire).

In March 2021, The Michaels Companies agreed to be acquired by private equity company Apollo Global Management, taking the company private.

Products

Michaels Stores sell a variety of arts and crafts products, including scrapbooking, beading, knitting, rubber stamping, home décor items, floral items, kids' crafts, paints, framing, greenery, baking and many seasonal items. Michaels produces a number of private brands including Recollections, Studio Decor, Bead Landing, Creatology, Ashland, Celebrate It, Art Minds, Artist's Loft, Craft Smart, Loops & Threads, Make Market, Foamies, LockerLookz, Imagin8, and Sticky Sticks.

The company also offers custom framing through its Aaron Brothers Custom Framing store-within-a-store and online. Online, customers can upload, edit and print photos from their computer or social media sites. They can then select and customize the size, surface, frame and mat.

The company also develops over a dozen private brands sold in Michaels stores, including Recollections, Studio Décor, Bead Landing, Creatology and Ashland.

References

External links
 

Companies formerly listed on the Nasdaq
Arts and crafts retailers
American companies established in 1973
Companies based in Irving, Texas
Retail companies of the United States
Retail companies established in 1973
1973 establishments in Texas
2006 mergers and acquisitions
2014 initial public offerings
Apollo Global Management companies
2021 mergers and acquisitions
Private equity portfolio companies